Viasat Film HD is a pay-television channel which is owned by Viasat. The channel shows the same films as Viasat Film, but in HD-quality. The films which were not originally in HD are still shown in SD-quality. The channel was launched on 15 January 2008 a TV1000 HD.

See also
TV1000 (disambiguation)

External links
 TV1000

Television stations in Denmark
Television channels and stations established in 2008